Lilium parvum is a species of lily known by the common names Sierra tiger lily and alpine lily. It is native to the mountains of the western United States, primarily the Sierra Nevada of California but also with additional populations in northwestern Nevada and southwestern Oregon. The plant grows in high altitude forests, sending up flowering stalks during the summer months.

Description
The flowers of Lilium parvum are smaller than those of other lilies, and more bell-shaped than most others. They are yellowish-orange to dark orange-red with lighter orange or yellow centers. The petals are spotted with purple or brown markings. There is a variety that bears lighter pink flowers in the foothills of El Dorado County, California, which is known by the informal common name ditch lily. The plant also readily hybridizes with other Lilium species growing close by.

References

External links
United States Department of Agriculture Plants Profile; Lilium parvum
Jepson Manual Treatment - ''Lilium parvum
Lilium parvum -Calfotos Photo gallery, University of California

parvum
Endemic flora of the United States
Flora of California
Flora of Nevada
Flora of Oregon
Flora of the Sierra Nevada (United States)
Natural history of the California chaparral and woodlands
Natural history of El Dorado County, California
Taxa named by Albert Kellogg
Flora without expected TNC conservation status